Therea may refer to:

 Therea (insect), a genus of cockroaches including the seven-spotted cockroach
 Therea (comics), a mystic extra-dimensional realm from the Marvel Universe